Ponerorchis bifoliatum (synonym Amitostigma bifoliatum) is a species of plant in the family Orchidaceae. It is endemic to China, known only from Gansu and Sichuan. It produces pale purple flowers.

Taxonomy
The species was first described in 1936 by Tsin Tang and Fa Tsuan Wang, as Amitostigma bifoliatum. A molecular phylogenetic study in 2014 found that species of Amitostigma, Neottianthe and Ponerorchis were mixed together in a single clade, making none of the three genera monophyletic as then circumscribed. Amitostigma and Neottianthe were subsumed into Ponerorchis, with this species becoming Ponerorchis bifoliata.

References 

Endemic orchids of China
bifoliata
Endangered plants
Flora of Gansu
Orchids of Sichuan
Plants described in 1936
Taxonomy articles created by Polbot
Taxobox binomials not recognized by IUCN